Soleil Radio is a commercial radio station broadcasting to the Channel Islands of Jersey, Guernsey, Alderney, Sark and Herm on DAB+ digital radio.

It is an easy listening station, playing relaxing music from the 1960s to present day. Soleil Radio was set up by staff at Channel 103 and Island FM to coincide with the launch of DAB in the Channel Islands. The station is owned and operated by Tindle Radio.

The station launched on 1 August 2021 and is available on DAB+, online and on mobile devices and smart speakers.

Programming 

Programmes are presented and produced from Channel 103 and Island FM's studios in St Helier and St Sampson, with presenter-led shows during peak times.

The station's presenters include:
 Liam Cash (Channel 103/Signal 1)
 Dan Mills (Star Radio/Heart)
 Peter Mac (Channel 103 Breakfast)
 James Bentley (Island FM Breakfast)

Soleil Radio broadcasts hourly Channel Islands news bulletins between 7am and 6pm during the week, and 8am-12pm at weekends, produced by journalists at Channel 103 and Island FM.

The station positions itself as playing 'more music' than other commercial radio stations serving the Channel Islands, including a back-to-back '60 Minute Music Marathon' weekday lunchtimes, and specialist/themed music programmes at weekends.

See also
Mass media in Jersey
Channel 103
Island FM

References

External links 
 
 Media.info

Radio stations in Guernsey
Radio stations in Jersey
Radio stations in the United Kingdom
Radio stations established in 2021